K43 may refer to:
 K-43 (Kansas highway)
 K-43 truck, an American military truck
 , a corvette of the Indian Navy
 Junkers K 43, a German transport aircraft
 Karabiner 43, a German rifle
 Potassium-43, an isotope of potassium
 
 Symphony No. 6 (Mozart), by Wolfgang Amadeus Mozart
 Unionville Municipal Airport, in Putnam County, Missouri